Dolgorukov, Dolgorukova may refer to:

 House of Dolgorukov, the Dolgorukov family and its members, descendants of Mikhail of Chernigov
 Yuri Dolgoruki, a 12th-century semi-legendary Rurikid prince
 Dolgorukov District, a district (rayon) of Lipetsk Oblast

See also
 Dolgorukovo (disambiguation), for a number of villages named "Dolgorukovo"
 Russian submarine Yury Dolgorukiy